The Asian Highway 143  is part of the Asian Highway Network. It connects from Buangkok East Drive (Sengkang) all the way to Senai North Interchange.

Singapore
Kallang–Paya Lebar Expressway
Marina Coastal Expressway
Ayer Rajah Expressway

Malaysia
Second Link Expressway (Previously AH2), completion of Johor Bahru Eastern Dispersal Link Expressway (EDL) in 2012, AH2 re-routed to EDL.

References

Asian Highway Network
Expressways in Singapore
Sengkang
Expressways in Malaysia
Johor